The Steele Homestead is a historic homestead located along Wyoming Highway 191 northeast of Boulder, Wyoming. The homestead was established in 1886 by Ed P. Steele, who built a one-room cabin at the site; this cabin was expanded several times until it grew to eight rooms after a 1908 addition. Meanwhile, the ranch continued to add buildings, including a main barn and several sheds; it now has seventeen buildings, fourteen of which are contributing buildings to its National Register listing. Steele's children all stayed in the ranching business, and the homestead is still owned by his descendants.

The homestead was added to the National Register of Historic Places on April 25, 1985.

References

External links

Ranches on the National Register of Historic Places in Wyoming
Buildings and structures completed in 1886
Buildings and structures in Sublette County, Wyoming
National Register of Historic Places in Sublette County, Wyoming